Philip Edward Pusey (1830-1880), son of the Hebrew scholar and leader of the Anglo-Catholic Oxford Movement, Edward Bouverie Pusey, was an English Aramaicist. He started the work continued by George Gwilliam on making an edition of the Aramaic New Testament of the Peshitta. The utility of the edition is however limited by its reliance on late sources.

Philip Edward Pusey also edited several of the works of St. Cyril of Alexandria.

References

External links
 
 

Syriacists
1880 deaths
1830 births
Sherard family